South Somerset Warriors were a rugby league team based in Yeovil, Somerset. They played in the South West Division of the Rugby League Conference.

History

South Somerset Warriors were formed in 2010 and joined the South West Division of the Rugby League Conference that same year; their first ever game was a 64 - 26 win against Somerset Vikings. They finished the season in 6th place.

In the 2011 season they were in the South West Division again but folded on 20 May after being unable to fulfil their fixtures.

References

External links
Official website

Rugby League Conference teams
Rugby league teams in Somerset
Rugby clubs established in 2010